Nikolay Pavlovich Korolkov (born 28 November 1946, in Rostov-on-Don) is an equestrian and Olympic champion from Russia. He won a gold medal in show jumping with the Soviet team and an individual silver medal at the 1980 Summer Olympics in Moscow.

References

1946 births
Living people
Russian male equestrians
Soviet male equestrians
Olympic equestrians of the Soviet Union
Olympic gold medalists for the Soviet Union
Olympic silver medalists for the Soviet Union
Equestrians at the 1980 Summer Olympics
Olympic medalists in equestrian
Sportspeople from Rostov-on-Don
Medalists at the 1980 Summer Olympics